Urocyclus is a genus of air-breathing land slugs, terrestrial gastropod mollusks in the family Urocyclidae.

Urocyclus is the type genus of the family Urocyclidae.

Species 
Species within the genus Urocyclus include:
 Urocyclus acuminatus Poirier, 1887
 Urocyclus auratus Dupouy, 1966
 Urocyclus comorensis Fischer, 1882
 Urocyclus grillensis Simroth, 1910
 Urocyclus kirkii Gray, 1864
 Urocyclus longicauda Fischer, 1882
 Urocyclus madagascariensis Poirier, 1887
 Urocyclus morotzensis Simroth, 1910
 Urocyclus pinguis Robson, 1914
 Urocyclus riparius Simroth, 1910
 Urocyclus vittatus Fischer, 1882

Subgenera:
 Urocyclina Dupouy, 1966
 Kirkia Pollonera, 1909
 Urocyclus Gray, 1864

References 

Urocyclidae
Taxa named by John Edward Gray